Supercoco are a coconut candy from Colombia. The rectangular candy are packaged in green wrapping with yellow writing and are brown in color.

Further reading

References

Brand name confectionery